Hussain Nihan (born 6 July 1992), known as Niheart, is a Maldivian professional footballer who plays as a midfielder for Maziya.

Career
Nihan started his career as a 19 year old teenager at Club Eagles in 2012. He joined Victory Sports Club in the year 2013 and went on to play for them until signing for Club Valencia in 2015. Nihan played a vital role in Valencia's 2016 Maldives FA Cup win, helping them to lift the FA Cup trophy after 12 years. Following a successful three years at Club Valencia, Nihan again signed for Victory Sports Club in 2018. His display at Victory earned him his first national team call-up.

On 6 March 2019, Nihan joined Maziya on a three year deal.

International
Nihan was first called up for Maldives national football team in 2018, making his debut in an international friendly against Singapore, replacing Mohamed Umair at stoppage time in the second half. Maldives lost the match 3-2, at the National Stadium, Singapore.

His first tournament action was at 2018 SAFF Championship. Despite being an unused sub in the group stage, he started in the semi-final and final against Nepal and India respectively. 2018 SAFF Championship Final against India was his first 90 minutes in national colors, in which the Maldives beat India 2-1, to become the second nation to win the tournament more than once.

International goals

Honours

Maldives
SAFF Championship: 2018

References

External links
 

1992 births
Living people
Maldivian footballers
Association football midfielders
Maldives international footballers
Victory Sports Club players
Club Valencia players
Maziya S&RC players
Footballers at the 2014 Asian Games
Asian Games competitors for the Maldives
Club Eagles players